Richard Barrington "Rikki" Beadle-Blair MBE (born July 1961) is a British actor, director, screenwriter, playwright, singer, designer, choreographer, dancer and songwriter of British/West Indian origin.

Early life
Blair was born in Camberwell and raised in Bermondsey, both in south London, by a single mother, Monica Beadle (who was born in 1944 in Jamaica). She had moved to Britain when she was 12 and was the first black child in her school in Peckham. Rikki was brought up with a brother, Gary Beadle (also an actor, of Eastenders fame), four years younger, and a sister, eight years younger. He attended Lois Acton's Experimental Bermondsey Lampost Free School.

Career

When he was 17 he performed a capella concerts at the Gay's the Word bookshop in Bloomsbury, London, with fellow singers Robert Chevara and Michelle Baughan. The group went under the name of "Three People".  He was also involved with the Gay Liberation Front (GLF).

In 1979 he won the Evening Standard′s Edward Bond's Young Playwright award for the play A-Z.

In the film Sirens he played Blue, a punky Scouse heroin junkie.

His band Boysie included Sean Mayes on piano, Leonard Davies on bass, Baden Hill on guitar and Martin Harmer on drums.

In 1994, he wrote the screenplay for Nigel Finch's film Stonewall, about the Stonewall Riots.

In 1999 he wrote Native, a Radio 4 play that became a short film directed by Rene Mohandas.

In 2000 he wrote and performed a series of short radio plays for Radio 4 – including Fares Fair, Puppy Love, Finders Keepers, Silly Me and Open Pores.

In 2001 he adapted Boy George's autobiography Take It Like A Man for a BBC film. This has not yet been produced.

In March 2001, he wrote, produced, and directed the Channel 4 television series Metrosexuality in which he played a lead role.  This also featured Noel Clarke, who went on to write and star in the movie Kidulthood.  Beadle-Blair co-wrote and co-produced the soundtrack album with Mark Hawkes.  On the album he sings a duet with Davie Fairbanks who played "Bambi" in the series.  Noel Clarke contributes two raps to the album, which also features a track performed by Mat Fraser.

The same year, he hosted the Big Up Yourself And Be Proud show at The Brixtonian during Mardi Gras Festival in aid of GMFA, a London-based gay men's health charity whose Big Up initiative (targeting black men) he is supporting.

In 2002, his documentary Roots of Homophobia, for BBC Radio 4 won the Sony Radio Academy Awards for Best Radio Feature. There he brings his own experience as a gay black man to inform his investigation into homophobic attitudes in Jamaican pop music.

He was the Executive story editor for both seasons of the US TV series Noah's Arc. He was also a writer on season two (credited for eps 2 & 4).

He was supervising director for the South African organisation for first-time filmmakers  Out of Africa. in 2004 and 2005

Beadle-Blair has written songs for Kevin Marques. His theatre company, Team Angelica, is resident at the Tristan Bates Theatre in Covent Garden, London.

In 2005, Beadle-Blair wrote and directed the play Bashment for Theatre Royal Stratford East. The play tackled homophobia in the ragga/hip-hop music scene and ran two seasons in May and September. Beadle-Blair also wrote the music. Bashment was nominated for "Best New Play" at the national TMA Awards.

Beadle-Blair has adapted his own screenplay of Stonewall for the stage and his production company Team Angelica, which he took to the 2007 Edinburgh Festival.  He also directed, produced, designed both sets & costumes, & choreographed on the show. The play was nominated for "Best Ensemble" at The Stage Awards for Acting Excellence.

In May 2006, Beadle-Blair wrote and directed Jucy for Queer Contact at the Contact Theatre in Manchester, as part of the Queer Up North Festival.

In Autumn 2007, FIT, a play for young people commissioned by the Manchester-based arts organisation queerupnorth and the gay equality organisation Stonewall, went on tour around the UK. The play was developed to help tackle homophobic bullying in Britain's schools. The play was performed at The Drill Hall in London, The Birmingham Rep, The Contact Theatre in Manchester, the Unity Theatre in Liverpool, and the CCA in Glasgow. The show was performed in schools in London, Greater Manchester, Bournemouth, Brighton and Glasgow.  Beadle-Blair, directed, choreographed, composed and wrote the show.

His "painful" comedy play Familyman opened for a month at Theatre Royal Stratford East in May 2008 – the lead role of "Caesar Ramsay" was being played by Gary Beadle, his brother. The play was named "Show of the Week" for Time Out.

In May 2008 he directed Best Man by Greg Owen at the Dublin Gay Theatre Festival.  Greg Owen won the Oscar Wilde Award for New Writing.  The play was developed under the Team Angelica umbrella.

Beadle-Blair previewed a trio of new plays in June 2008 at the Tristan Bates Theatre, all written simultaneously: Screwface – about nine teenage murderers in a prison drama workshop, Touch – centred on gay life in Iraq today, and Home – which looked at teenagers emerging from the care system into their own accommodation and sperm donor offspring who are searching for their siblings.

In October–November 2008 there was a second shorter but higher-profile tour of FIT, touring to Edinburgh, Birmingham, Liverpool and London, including shows at St Stephen's in Edinburgh, The Birmingham Rep and the Drill Hall Theatres.

In November 2008 he was the M.C. for the "Liverpool is Burning" Vogue Ball at the Adelphi Ballroom in Liverpool, produced by Duckie for Homotopia.

In January 2009 Team Angelica, in association with the fledgling Achilles Productions, founded by actors Ian Sharp and Rebecca Joerin staged a one-off theatrical presentation of Beadle-Blair screenplay KickOff at the Riverside Studios in Hammersmith.

In February 2009 he curated Louder than Words at the Tristan Bates Theatre, a season of new writing featuring 14 plays by mostly first-time writers.  He directed 10 of the plays.

Beadle-Blair has a long-standing creative association with fellow writer John R Gordon, who was also a writer for Noah's Arc.    Beadle-Blair Directed John's first short film script, Souljah (2007), which premiered in the London Film Festival and is currently touring the Film Festival circuit.  He also appeared in John's first play, Wheels of Steel, which John R. Gordon directed.  The two-hander also featured Karl Collins, who went on to play Beadle-Blair's ex-husband Jordan in Metrosexuality. Gordon now runs the Team Angelica books division.

He has helped to develop new work by playwrights Matt Harris, Jai Rajani, John R. Gordon, Greg Owen, Stephen Hoo & Hannah Chalmers.

He teaches a six-week course at the Actor's Centre called "In the Room" that mentors Actors and creatives. He has developed an advanced module called 'Seizing the Room'.

In June 2008 he was included in the Independent on Sunday newspaper's "Pink List" as one of the UK's most powerful/influential gay people.

In July 2008 his short film Souljah won the award for best short film at the Rushes Soho Shorts festival.  Written by John Gordon and produced by Beadle-Blair, Gordon and Carleen Beadle.

In June 2009 he hosted the Urban Stage at London Pride.

In June 2009 he completed the 35min short 7 Dials, in which the lives of 33 characters intersect and intertwine in the Seven Dials area of London's Covent Garden.  Beadle-Blair wrote and directed this showcase for the participants of BBC Talent Boost – A scheme to increase visibility for minority actors in the UK.

In June/July 2009 he shot the feature film Kickoff – a Team Angelica co-production with Achilles Entertainments and Shorthouse Productions. Post-production was completed in November 2009.

In August or 2009 he was a course director at the National Youth Theatre for the second year running.

In September 2009 he wrote and directed, the Feature-Film/DVD version of Fit, featuring the original cast members, along with 36 other actors.  The film was financed by Stonewall, and produced by Diane Shorthouse, Carleen Beadle and Rikki Beadle-Blair for Stonewall, The Shorthouse Organisation and Team Angelica.

On 19 November 2009, Beadle-Blair/Team Angelica staged a double-bill of plays at the Drill Hall Theatre – Fucking Charlie and The Grope Box.

In December 2009 he directed Stripped at the Tristan Bates Theatre, written and performed by Hannah Chalmers.  Stripped was originally written and developed with the guidance of Beadle-Blair and John R Gordon as part of the "Louder than Words" season in February.  Stripped ran for a month in Edinburgh at the Gilded Balloon.

In June 2010 he wrote and directed the feature-film version of Bashment, featuring members of the original cast.

In December 2010 he wrote and directed the Team Angelica production twothousandandSex – featuring 35 actors – at the Drill Hall Theatre.

In March 2011 he was awarded an achievement award by the Outfest/Fusion festival in Los Angeles. The award was presented by Guillermo Diaz, who played LaMiranda in the movie of Stonewall at Grauman's Egyptian Theatre in Hollywood.  The ceremony was accompanied by a gala screening of Fit.

In April 2011 he was commissioned by the Royal Albert Hall to write direct and design the short film Butterfly.  It was based on the winning entries from a schools competition in which students had to pitch a modern version of Madam Butterfly.

In October–November 2011 he wrote, directed and designed Shalom Baby at Theatre Royal Stratford East.

In November 2011, Beadle-Blair along with John R. Gordon, established Team Angelica Books.  Its first publication was Beadle-Blair's first book What I Learned Today, compiled from a year's worth of his Facebook statuses.  Subsequently, the company has published Fairytales for Lost Children, a book of short writings by gay Somalian Diriye Osman, plus two novels by John R Gordon, Faggamuffin and Colour Scheme.In 2011, 2012 2013, 2014, Beadle-Blair and John R. Gordon ran the Angelic Tales new-writing festival, mentoring several new writers of varied experience, staged readings were performed at Theatre Royal Stratford East.  Several of the plays went to full productions – including Crowning Glory by Somalia Seaton at the Theatre Royal Stratford East. Lean by Isley Lynn at the Tristan Bates and Stepby Lynette Linton.

In September 2012, One of the Angelic Tales plays Slap by Alexis Gregory was invited to present another more-developed staged reading at Channel 4's London HQ, directed by Beadle-Blair. The Q&A was hosted by Gok Wan

In January 2013 Beadle-Blair directed and designed a full production of Step, written by first-time playwright Lynette Linton and performed Theatre Royal Stratford East's Young Actor's company. The tour included the Soho Theatre and Theatre Royal Stratford East.  The play had been developed through the Angelic Tales New Writing Festival at Theatre Royal Stratford East.

In May 2013 he wrote, directed and designed Gutted at Theatre Royal Stratford East. The cast was headed by Louise Jameson of Dr Who fame, and also featured Ashley Campbell, Frankie Fitzgerald, Gavin McClusky, Jamie Nichols, Jennifer Daley, James Farrar, and Sasha Frost.

In November 2013, Beadle-Blair with guitarist Joni Levinson, performed a number onstage at the Kings Head in London as part of Robert Chevara's production of Die Fleidermaus.

In February 2014, the US independent feature Blackbird premiered as the closing film at the Pan-African Film Festival in Los Angeles. The movie was co-written by Beadle-Blair and Patrik-Ian Polk and starred Oscar-winning actress Mo'Nique.

In March 2014, Beadle-Blair, directed, designed and co-produced a short run of slap by Alexis Gregory at Theatre Royal Stratford East. This was a special "immersive" production with the audience integrated into the set of the show, sometimes touching the actors.

In March 2014, Beadle-Blair completed and premiered FREE, the "sibling" film to FIT, also co-produced and released by Stonewall. This film was created to challenge homophobic bullying in primary schools and was made available to every school in the UK.

Beadle-Blair was appointed Member of the Order of the British Empire (MBE) in the 2016 Birthday Honours for services to drama.

Selected plays

 Kick-Off – January 2009, Riverside Studios
 Fit (Autumn 2008) St Stephen's Edinburgh, Birmingham Rep Theatre, Drill Hall Theatre and Schools in Liverpool, Edinburgh and London
 Home – Tristan Bates Theatre (June 2008)
 Touch – Tristan Bates Theatre (June 2008)
 Screwface – Tristan Bates Theatre (June 2008).
 Familyman – Theatre Royal Stratford East (May 2008, directed by Dawn Reid). Text published by Oberon Books.FIT (2007) – National Tour – adapted for filmStonewall (2006/7) – stage adaptation of the BBC film.
 Taken In (2005) – Set in a halfway house for homeless youths.Bashment (2005) – explores the controversy around dancehall reggae music and the consequences of homophobic lyrics  – Theatre Royal Stratford East.  Text published by Oberon Books.Totally Practically Naked in My Room on a Wednesday Night (2005) – a night in the life of 17-year-old Dylan, desperate to lose his virginity.
 South London Passion Plays trilogy (Gutted, Laters and Sweet) (2004) – Tristan Bates TheatreCaptivated (1997) – the story of a gay black man imprisoned for murder. Shane corresponds with an Asian pen pal who writes him as an act of charity. Shane's self-hatred turns into a soul-searching journey from cockiness to agonised self-reflection, and finally ultimate gratitude for his unseen friend.  This was released on video (now deleted) Directed by David SquireAsk and Tell – homosexuality and the Army.twothousandandSex – an ensemble play about sex and sexuality featuring 35 actors – at the Drill Hall Theatre.

Four one-hour ensemble plays
 Exposures Street Art The Grope Box Fucking Charlie Below the Radar – a straight guy/gay guy pair of roommates and their sexual misadventures in New Orleans.Human – two terminally ill cancer patients get together for a final riotous love affair.Prettyboy – described as a 'Dogma Style Musical"  at the Oval House Theatre.Gunplay (he did not direct)Wild at Heart Riverside Studios (1988)

Beadle-Blair directed Greg Owen and Nick McGarrigle in their play Best Man at the Dublin Gay Theatre Festival.  The play won the writers the Oscar Wilde Award for best writing.

He directed and appeared in Matt Harris's comedy play Venom at the Oval house 2003.

He directed the staged readings of Jai Rajani's onenight.com at the Tristan Bates and the Contact Theatre Manchester in 2007.

He performed as part of the 40th anniversary of the Stonewall Riots at the Southbank Centre. Other speakers/performers included Professor Jeffrey Weeks, Peter Tatchell, Lindsay River, and Michael Twaits, 9 July 2009.

 See also 
London Lesbian and Gay Film Festival

References

External links and sources
Personal MySpace
Team Angelica MySpace

The Guardian: Theatre that's FIT for purpose: tackling homophobia, November 2008
Pink News: FIT playwright on why we must fight homophobia in schools – December 2007 (republished November 2008)
Interview on Rainbow Network, 6 June 2005
Rikki Beadle-Blair on Metrosexuality 
interview  in Closer Magazine, April 2002 ?
script of Roots of Homophobia (scroll down to No 6)
Interview of Beadle-Blair in The Independent, August 2007
 Interview of Beadle-Blair in The Guardian'', August 2007

Living people
1961 births
Black British male actors
English people of Jamaican descent
English gay actors
Gay dancers
English gay musicians
English gay writers
LGBT Black British people
LGBT theatre directors
Gay singers
English LGBT singers
Members of the Order of the British Empire
National Youth Theatre members
People from Bermondsey
People from Camberwell
20th-century English LGBT people
21st-century English LGBT people
LGBT television directors